Carlton George Douglas (born 10 May 1942) is a Jamaican-British recording artist based in the UK who is best known for the 1974 disco single "Kung Fu Fighting".

Early life
Carlton George Douglas was born in Kingston. He later lived in the U.S. state of California before relocating to London, England as a teenager. He spent his childhood in England playing football, and vocal training. In his youth, he developed a passion for soul music (citing Sam Cooke and Otis Redding as his biggest influences) and a trained tenor voice, which he would display in church singing various religious songs.

Career
Douglas's career was based in the United Kingdom. His disco single "Kung Fu Fighting", produced by British producer Biddu, ranked number one on both the UK Singles Chart and the U.S. Billboard Hot 100 in 1974. The single sold 11 million copies worldwide, making it one of the best-selling singles of all time. The single was later certified gold by the RIAA on 27 November 1974.

The single, which is a homage to martial arts films, has overshadowed the rest of Douglas's career, and has led to his appearance on other artists' versions of the song. In the United States, Douglas is considered a one-hit wonder, since he is known only for "Kung Fu Fighting" (the follow-up "Dance the Kung Fu" did not crack the top 40). However, in the United Kingdom, two of his other singles made it into the top 40: "Dance the Kung Fu", which peaked at number 35 in the charts, and "Run Back", which peaked at number 25.

Douglas was once managed by Eric Woolfson, who later became the primary songwriter behind the Alan Parsons Project.

In 1998, a re-recording of "Kung Fu Fighting", performed by British dance act Bus Stop and which featured Douglas's vocals, peaked at number 8 on the UK Singles Chart.

The single "Dance the Kung Fu" was sampled on "Cuda nie widy" from the 2001 album Nibylandia by Polish group Ego, and later by DJ Premier on his 2007 remix of Nike's 25th Air Force One anniversary single "Classic (Better Than I've Ever Been)", featuring Kanye West, Nas, KRS-One, and Rakim.

Douglas is represented by music publisher Schacht Musikverlage (SMV) in Hamburg, Germany.

Discography

Albums

Singles

See also
List of artists who reached number one on the UK Singles Chart
List of artists who reached number one in the United States
List of artists who reached number one on the Australian singles chart
List of 1970s one-hit wonders in the United States

Notes

References

1942 births
Living people
Musicians from Kingston, Jamaica
Grammy Award winners
Jamaican male singers
Jamaican expatriates in the United Kingdom
Jamaican expatriates in Germany
Pye Records artists
20th-century Jamaican singers
20th Century Fox Records artists